Oskelu (also Romanized as Oskelū, Eskaloo, and Eskalū; also known as Iskyulyu and Osgelū; also written as Üskülü) is a village in Misheh Pareh Rural District of the Central District of Kaleybar County, East Azerbaijan province, Iran. At the 2006 National Census, its population was 991 in 209 households. The following census in 2011 counted 993 people in 258 households. The latest census in 2016 showed a population of 827 people in 265 households; it was the largest village in its rural district.

According to locals the village had been occasionally used by the crown princes in Qajar era as summer quarters. There is no record of such claim, but the surviving landscaping in a forest on the west side of the village, known as valiahd qoroghi, provides a strong support to the assertion. The first allusion to Oskelu in the published literature is by Asadollah Mohammadkhanlu, the last headman of Mohammad Khanlu tribe, who had counted some of the inhabitants as the settled member of the tribe.
   
During 1980s and early 1990s Oskelu was the last village on the west of Kaleybar that had access to a town via paved road. One of the inhabitants, Mashhadi Aziz, had built an inn with minimum accommodation for the travelers to the remote villages, such as Abbasaba and Balan. Then, the road was extended to Asheqlu in the banks of Aras river and Oskelu lost most of its importance. However, Oskelu did not experience the drastic population decline of other villages in Arasbaran region. Instead, since 2005 the wealthy expatriates have returned and constructed modern summer residences.

References 

Kaleybar County

Populated places in East Azerbaijan Province

Populated places in Kaleybar County

Kurdish settlements in East Azerbaijan Province